A traffic model is a mathematical model of real-world traffic, usually, but not restricted to, road traffic. Traffic modeling draws heavily on theoretical foundations like network theory and certain theories from physics like the kinematic wave model. The interesting quantity being modeled and measured is the traffic flow, i.e. the throughput of mobile units (e.g. vehicles) per time and transportation medium capacity (e.g. road or lane width). Models can teach researchers and engineers how to ensure an optimal flow with a minimum number of traffic jams.

Traffic models often are the basis of a traffic simulation.

Types
Microscopic traffic flow model Traffic flow is assumed to depend on individual mobile units, i.e. cars, which are explicitly modeled
Macroscopic traffic flow model Only the mass action or the statistical properties of a large number of units is analyzed

Examples
 Biham–Middleton–Levine traffic model
 Traffic generation model
 History of network traffic models
 Traffic mix
 Intelligent driver model
 Network traffic
 Three-phase traffic theory
 Two-fluid model

See also
Braess's paradox
Gridlock
Mobility model
Network traffic
Network traffic simulation
Traffic bottleneck
Traffic flow
Traffic wave
Queueing theory
Traffic equations

References

External links
http://math.mit.edu/projects/traffic/

Traffic flow
Mathematical modeling